Jarrett Tomás Barrios (born October 16, 1968) is the chief executive officer of the American Red Cross Los Angeles Region, a former politician and activist. Prior to this, he served as the CEO of the American Red Cross of Massachusetts. Barrios served as a member of both the Massachusetts House of Representatives and the Massachusetts Senate and became the first Latino and first openly gay man elected to the Massachusetts Senate. He subsequently served as president of the Blue Cross and Blue Shield of Massachusetts Foundation and, later, of the Gay & Lesbian Alliance Against Defamation (GLAAD).

Early life and education 
The son of a Cuban-American carpenter and a Cuban-American social worker in Tampa, Florida, Barrios moved to Cambridge, Massachusetts at the age of 17 to study at Harvard College after graduating from Jefferson High School in Tampa. After graduating in 1990 with high honors and working for the Boston City Council, he earned his law degree with honors from Georgetown University. Eisenhower Fellowships selected Jarrett Barrios as a USA Eisenhower Fellow in 2009.

Career

Red Cross 

Barrios has served as the Chief Executive Officer of various regions of the Red Cross in the USA since 2011. Barrios took over as CEO of the Red Cross of Los Angeles on March 3, 2014. He has served as the Chief Executive Officer of the American Red Cross of Massachusetts since 2011. Barrios was credited with expanding and revitalizing the organization's mandate and leading it through two of Massachusetts' most serious disasters since the 1978 blizzard, namely the Boston Marathon bombings and blizzard Nemo in 2013. Since Barrios took the helm, the Red Cross of Massachusetts has expanded its volunteer base by 400 percent and doubled the number of Red Cross youth clubs in Massachusetts high schools.

Massachusetts House 

Barrios began his legislative career in 1998 when he was elected to the Massachusetts House of Representatives. The first major legislation he wrote was a law requiring hospital emergency rooms to provide interpreter services for non-English speakers. He also authored legislation creating a statewide affordable housing trust and establishing a low-income housing tax credit, which provides an incentive for developers to create affordable housing. He was the prime sponsor of a bill that enhanced state disaster relief efforts in coordination with the American Red Cross.

In 2002, the voters of the Middlesex, Suffolk and Essex District - including parts of Boston, Cambridge, Somerville, Everett, Revere, Chelsea and Saugus - elected him to the state Senate, and he was re-elected unopposed in both 2004 and 2006.

As a state senator, Barrios successfully helped lead the legislative effort to protect marriage equality in Massachusetts, and is best known for a globally televised speech where he spoke on discrimination faced by his own family.

Barrios chaired the Committee on Public Safety and Homeland Security. He authored legislation creating a state witness protection program and establishing an anti-gang violence grant program known as the Shannon Grant. He also authored one of the nation's most comprehensive identity theft laws, which provided new protections to consumers whose personal data is stolen from retailers or other third parties. Barrios wrote a law updating state fire codes in the wake of a deadly night club fire in neighboring Rhode Island. He also authored an "anti-bullying" bill, which only passed the state Senate, directing schools to respond more aggressively to student reports of violence and "cyber bullying."

On other issues, Barrios authored a law designed to protect homeowners from foreclosure and to crack down on unscrupulous subprime lenders. The law created a first-in-the-nation requirement that mortgage bankers and brokers abide by the state Community Reinvestment Act, which previously applied only to credit unions and banks. He led Senate passage of legislation promoting "environmental justice," addressing health care disparities among minorities, and strengthening enforcement of "buffer zones" around women's health facilities.

Other organizations 

Barrios held leadership roles in several other organizations.
 Blue Cross Blue Shield of Massachusetts Foundation: On May 22, 2007, Barrios resigned from the Senate to become the president of the state's largest health foundation, the Blue Cross Blue Shield of Massachusetts Foundation. The foundation focuses on expanding access to health coverage and medical care for state residents. It plays a central role in the implementation of the state's universal health care program, providing data and analysis on the program's performance and convening health care stakeholders to address emerging issues. After arriving at the foundation, Barrios launched two new policy initiatives. The Care Beyond Coverage initiative is analyzing barriers to health care faced by people who have health insurance. The Community Health Mapping Project is linking data on health outcomes with environmental risk factors and other social determinants of health, such as violence and air quality.
 Barrios served as president of GLAAD from September 2009 to June 2011, making him the only bilingual leader of a national LGBT organization. Several members of the board and Barrios resigned in 2011 after the organization was perceived to have improperly advocated for one of its corporate donors in AT&T's merger discussions with T-Mobile.

Barrios serves in leadership roles in several nonprofit organizations.
 Planned Parenthood Action Fund in New York City. Barrios serves on their board of directors.
 Massachusetts Center for Budget and Policy Priorities. Barrios serves on their board of directors.
 Commonwealth Shakespeare Company. Barrios serves on their board of directors.
 Latino Legacy Fund of The Boston Foundation. Barrios is an Advisory Committee member.
Barrios has also founded three nonprofit organizations.
 Oiste, a statewide Latino political organization, works to "create an educated and actively engaged Latino" community through grassroots organizing and civic education.
 Acceso, an international humanitarian organization, provides humanitarian outreach licensed by the U.S. government to the people of Cuba "who are struggling to obtain essential human goods such as medicine, medical supplies and reading materials."
 The Commonwealth Seminar, a professional training institute, "exists to open the doors of the Massachusetts State House to diverse leaders" through training, networking opportunities and access to public-service job opportunities.

Barrios was a co-author of the Dallas Principles.

Personal life 

Barrios married communications consultant and Democratic political operative Doug Hattaway in 2004. The couple divorced in 2010.

See also
 1999–2000 Massachusetts legislature
 2001–2002 Massachusetts legislature
 2003–2004 Massachusetts legislature
 2005–2006 Massachusetts legislature
 2007–2008 Massachusetts legislature

References

External links
 

1969 births
American politicians of Cuban descent
Gay politicians
Georgetown University Law Center alumni
Harvard College alumni
American LGBT rights activists
LGBT state legislators in Massachusetts
Living people
Massachusetts state senators
Members of the Massachusetts House of Representatives
American chief executives
American Red Cross personnel